The 62nd Indiana Infantry Regiment was an infantry regiment from Rockport, Indiana that failed to complete its organization to serve in the Union Army during the American Civil War.  The enlisted men were transferred to the 53rd Indiana Infantry Regiment on February 26, 1862.

One member, Colonel William Jones was a neighbor of young Abraham Lincoln; one of Lincoln's first jobs was working for Jones in Jones' general store.  Jones was killed during the Battle of Atlanta in 1864.

See also

 List of Indiana Civil War regiments

References

Bibliography 
 Dyer, Frederick H. (1959). A Compendium of the War of the Rebellion. New York and London. Thomas Yoseloff, Publisher. .

Units and formations of the Union Army from Indiana
1862 establishments in Indiana
Military units and formations established in 1862
Military units and formations disestablished in 1862